Keith Allan may refer to:

Keith Allan (linguist) (born 1943), Australian linguist
Keith William Allan (1946–2000), Australian solicitor
Keith Allan (actor) (born 1969), American actor and screenwriter

See also
Keith Allen (disambiguation)